Miss Universe 1971 was the 20th Miss Universe pageant, held at the Miami Beach Auditorium in Miami Beach, Florida, United States  on 24 July 1971.

At the end of the event, Marisol Malaret of Puerto Rico crowned Georgina Rizk of Lebanon as Miss Universe 1971. It is the first victory of Lebanon in the competition.

Contestants from 60 countries and territories participated in this year's pageant. The pageant was hosted by Bob Barker in his fifth consecutive year, while June Lockhart provided commentary and analysis throughout the event.

Results

Placements

Special awards

Selection committee

 Julio Alemán
 Margareta Arvidsson - Miss Universe 1966 from Sweden
 Edilson Cid Varela
 Eileen Ford
 George Fowler
 Yousuf Karsh
 Dong Kingman
 Jean-Louis Lindican
 Line Renaud
 Hitsiro Watanabe
 Earl Wilson

Contestants
60 contestants competed for the title.

Notes

Withdrawals

Returns 
Last competed in 1964:
 
Last competed in 1968:
 
Last competed in 1969:

References

1971
1971 in Florida
1971 in the United States
1971 beauty pageants
Beauty pageants in the United States
Events in Miami Beach, Florida
July 1971 events in the United States